Ross Cameron Stewart (born 11 July 1996) is a Scottish footballer who plays as a striker for EFL Championship club Sunderland and the Scotland national football team.

Club career

Junior League
After spells with the youth systems of professional clubs, Stewart started his career in the Scottish Juniors with Ardeer Thistle and Kilwinning Rangers, before making the step-up to senior football with Albion Rovers in July 2016. The part-time Coatbridge club were unable to pay the £1,500 transfer fee, with the funds instead provided by their supporters' club members and by Stewart's father.

St Mirren
After just one season with Albion Rovers, Stewart signed for Scottish Championship club St Mirren on a two-year full-time contract (a goalkeeper with the same name also joined at the time). Stewart scored on his debut for the Paisley club in a Scottish League Cup win versus Stranraer but failed to break into the first-team and was loaned out to Scottish League One club Alloa Athletic in December 2017, for the remainder of the season.

Ross County
On 10 August 2018, Stewart signed for Ross County. He made his debut for the club in a 2–1 victory in the Scottish Challenge Cup against Heart of Midlothian Colts. Stewart scored his first goal for the club in the next round of the cup in a win against Montrose. He finished his first season at Ross County with 11 goals, three of them coming against County's Rivals Inverness Caledonian Thistle as Ross County were promoted to the Scottish Premiership.

Sunderland
On 31 January 2021 Stewart joined English side Sunderland for an undisclosed fee. Stewart scored on his Sunderland debut after coming on as a substitute against Accrington Stanley in a 2–0 away win on 17 March 2021. He was later given the nickname 'Loch Ness Drogba' by Sunderland supporters in reference to his Scottish heritage and comparisons with prolific former Chelsea striker Didier Drogba.

On 21 May 2022, Stewart scored the second goal in the 2022 EFL League One play-off Final as Sunderland defeated Wycombe Wanderers 2–0 to gain promotion back to the EFL Championship. He finished the season as the league's joint top goalscorer with 26 goals and was later voted the PFA Fans' Player of the Year for League One.

International career
Stewart received his first call-up to the senior Scotland squad in March 2022 whilst playing for Sunderland AFC. He made his international debut on 8 June 2022, appearing as a substitute in a Nations League game against Armenia.

Career statistics

Club

International

Honours
Ross County
Scottish Championship: 2018–19
Scottish Challenge Cup: 2018–19

Sunderland
EFL Trophy: 2020–21
 EFL League One play-offs: 2022

Individual
PFA Fans' Player of the Year: 2021–22

References

External links

1996 births
Living people
Footballers from Irvine, North Ayrshire
Scottish footballers
Association football forwards
Albion Rovers F.C. players
St Mirren F.C. players
Alloa Athletic F.C. players
Ross County F.C. players
Celtic F.C. players
Partick Thistle F.C. players
Sunderland A.F.C. players
Ardeer Thistle F.C. players
Kilwinning Rangers F.C. players
Scottish Professional Football League players
Scottish Junior Football Association players
Scotland international footballers
English Football League players